Xu Dong (Chinese: 许东; born 17 February 1991 in Dalian) is a Chinese football player who currently plays for Wuhan FC in the Chinese Super League.

Club career
In 2010, Xu Dong started his professional footballer career with Liaoning Tiger in the China League Two division. In February 2011, Xu transferred to another China League Two side with Harbin Yiteng. In his first season with the club he would quickly establish himself as a vital member of the squad and went on to win the 2011 China League Two division title with them. This was soon followed by promotion to the top tier at the end of the 2013 league season. He would make his Chinese Super League debut for Harbin on 7 March 2014 in a game against Shandong Luneng Taishan in a 1–0 defeat.

In February 2015, Xu transferred to China League One side Beijing Enterprises. In February 2018, Xu transferred to Heilongjiang Lava Spring.

Career statistics 
Statistics accurate as of match played 31 December 2020.

Honours

Club
Harbin Yiteng
China League Two: 2011

References

External links
 

1991 births
Living people
Chinese footballers
Footballers from Dalian
Zhejiang Yiteng F.C. players
Beijing Sport University F.C. players
Heilongjiang Ice City F.C. players
Chinese Super League players
China League One players
China League Two players
Association football defenders